Scott Simon is an American journalist.

Scott Simon may also refer to:

Scott Simon (politician) (born 1961), Republican member of the Louisiana House of Representatives
Screamin' Scott Simon (born 1948), piano player for Sha Na Na

See also
Scott Siman

Simon (surname)